Yelantub (Yılantöp) is a rural locality (a village) in Ulkundinsky Selsoviet, Duvansky District, Bashkortostan, Russia. The population was 85 as of 2010. There are 3 streets.

Geography 
Yelantub is located 31 km northwest of Mesyagutovo (the district's administrative centre) by road. Mitrofanovka is the nearest rural locality.

References 

Rural localities in Duvansky District